Rujm el-Hiri (Rujm al-Hīrī;  Gilgal Refā'īm or Rogem Hiri) is an ancient megalithic monument consisting of concentric circles of stone with a tumulus at center.
 
Some circles are complete, others incomplete. The establishment of the site, and other nearby ancient settlements, is dated by archaeologists to the Early Bronze Age II period (3000–2700 BCE).

Since excavations have yielded very few material remains, Israeli archeologists theorize that the site was not a defensive position or a residential quarter but most likely a ritual center featuring ritual activity to placate the gods, or possibly linked to the cult of the dead.
However, there is no consensus regarding its function, as no similar structure has been found in the Near East.

Etymology
The name Rujm el-Hiri, "stone heap of the wild cat", was originally taken from Syrian maps. The term rujm in Arabic (pl. rujum; Hebrew: rogem) can also refer to a tumulus, a heap of stones underneath which human burial space was located. The name is sometimes romanized as Rujm Hiri or Rujum al-Hiri.

Rogem Hiri is a Hebrew version of the Arabic name Rujm el-Hiri. A modern Hebrew name used for the site is Gilgal Refā'īm or Galgal Refā'īm, "Wheel of Spirits" or "Wheel of Ghosts" as Refa'im means "ghosts" or "spirits".

Structure and description

The site's size and location, on a wide plateau which is also scattered with hundreds of dolmens, means that an aerial perspective is necessary to see the complete layout. The site was made from Basalt rocks, common in the Golan Heights due to the region's history of volcanic activity. It was estimated by Freikman that the transportation and building of the massive monument would have required more than 25,000 working days. The site is often referred to as the "Stonehenge of the Levant."

The remains consist of a large circle (slightly oval) of basalt rocks, containing four smaller concentric circles, each getting progressively thinner; some are complete, others incomplete. The walls of the circles are connected by irregularly placed smaller stone walls perpendicular to the circles.

The central tumulus is built from smaller rocks, and is thought to have been constructed after the surrounding walls were constructed. Connecting to it are four main stone walls. The first wall, shaped like a semicircle, is 50 m in diameter and 1.5 m wide. That wall is connected to a second one, an almost complete circle 90 m in diameter. The third wall is a full circle, 110 m in diameter and 2.6 m wide. The fourth and outermost wall is the largest: 150 m in diameter and 3.2 m wide.

Two entrances to the site face the northeast ( wide) and southeast ( wide). The axis of the tomb discovered at the site's center is similarly aligned. Mount Hermon is almost due north and Mount Tabor is close to December solstice sunrise. Geometry and astronomy are visually connected by the temple's design.

History and purpose
The site was cataloged during an archaeological survey carried out in 1967–1968 by Shmarya Gutman and Claire Epstein.  The site is probably the source of the legends about "a remnant of the giants" or Rephaim for Og. The surveyors used Syrian maps, and a Syrian triangulation post was found on top of its cairn. After this initial study, serious archaeological excavations commenced in the 1980s under Israeli professors Moshe Kochavi and Yoni Mizrachi, as part of the Land of Geshur Archaeological Project.

Hypotheses

 Worship According to this hypothesis, the site was used for special ceremonies during the longest and shortest days of the year. It seems, that in the year 3000 BCE, on the longest day, the first rays of the sun shone through the opening in the north-east gate, which is 20 by 29 meters. However, they did not shine in a perfect angle. It is assumed this is because the builders did not have sufficiently accurate architectural tools. The residents probably used the site to worship Tammuz and Ishtar, the gods of fertility, to thank them for the good harvest during the year. After the erection of the tomb in the center, the rays' path was blocked.
 Burial site It appears that the place of worship later became a burial site for leaders or other important individuals. Supporting this theory was the tomb in the dolmen. However, no human remains were found, only objects pointing to its function as a tomb. Also, even if it were a tomb, that was not the site's original function, as the tomb is 1,000 years newer than the site itself.
 Dakhma Archaeologist Rami Arav suggests the site was used like the Dakhmas of the Zoroastrians, in which dead persons were laid out for birds to remove the flesh from their bones.
 Calendar Some believe the site was used as an ancient calendar. At the times of the two equinoxes, the sun's rays would pass between two rocks, 2 m in height, 5 m in width, at the eastern edge of the compound.  According to Anthony Aveni and Yonatan Mizrachi the entrance to the center opens on sunrise of the summer solstice. Other notches in the walls indicate the spring and fall equinoxes.
 Astronomical observations Perhaps the site was used for astronomical observations of the constellations, probably for religious calculations. Researchers found the site was built with dimensions and scales common for other period structures, and partly based on the stars' positions.

Today
In 2007, the site was excavated by Yosef Garfinkel and Michael Freikman of the Hebrew University of Jerusalem. Freikman returned in the summer of 2010 for further investigation of the site's date and function. Freikman believes that the tomb in the center was built at the same time as the rings. Tomb robbers looted the remains, which included jewelry and weapons, but based on the discovery of one Chalcolithic pin dropped in a passageway, Freikman's theory is that the tomb was the centerpiece of the rings.

New Age movements advocating a return to nature gather at the site on the summer solstice and on the equinox to view the first rays of the sun shine through the rocks. 

The Golan Trail, a marked 130-kilometer walking trail that stretches along the whole length of the Golan Heights, passes Gilgal Refa'im.

See also
Carahunge
Anak
Excarnation
Atlit Yam, which contains a semi-circle of megaliths — another possible "Stonehenge of the Levant," but submerged today — with a 6270 BCE~6700 BCE destruction date.
Levantine archaeology

References

Bibliography

Further reading
Publications by Prof. Yonathan Mizrachi
 Mizrachi, Yonathan. 1992. "Rujm el-Hiri: Toward an understanding of a Bronze Age Megalithic Monument in the Levant". Department of Anthropology, Harvard University, Cambridge, MA. June, 1992. 350 pages including color plates and charts. Published in English.
 Aveni, Anthony and Yonathan Mizrachi. 1998. “The Geometry and the Astronomy of Rujm el-Hiri, a Megalithic site in the Southern Levant”. Journal of Field Archaeology 25(4)
 Mizrachi Yonathan, Mattanyah Zohar, Moshe Kochavi, Vincent Murphy, and Simcha Lev-Yadun. (1996). “Report of the 1988-1991 Exploration Efforts at Rogem Hiri, Golan Heights”. Israel Exploration Journal. Vol. 46 (3-4), 167-195.
 Lev-Yadun Simcha, Yonathan Mizrachi and Moshe Kochavi. (1996). “Lichenometric Studies of Cultural Formation Processes at Rogem Hiri, Golan Heights”. Israel Exploration Journal. Vol. 46 (3-4), 196-207.
 Mizrachi, Yonathan. (1992). “Bronze Age Circles on the Golan Heights”. National Geographic. December, Vol. 182, Number 6. In section Geographica (no page numbers).
 Mizrachi, Yonathan. (1992). “Mystery Circles on the Golan”. Biblical Archaeology Review. July/August, Vol. 18, No. 4, 46-57.
 Mizrachi, Yonathan. 1996. “Rujm el-Hiri”. The Oxford Encyclopedia of Archaeology in the Near East. New York: Oxford University Press. Invited Entry.
 Mizrachi Yonathan and Mattanyah Zohar. 1993. “Rogem Hiri (Rujm el-Hiri)”. The New Encyclopedia of Archaeological Excavations in the Holly Land, Jerusalem: The Israel Exploration Society and Carta Publishers Inc.

External links

Following Nature's Signpoints, Geographical magazine
 The wheel of giants, Jerusalem post
GoogleEarth placemark of Rujem el-Hiri Monument
 Aerial image of the site taken by a drone (by Weizmann Institute Ecophysiology Group; 10-Nov-2018)
 

Chalcolithic
Former populated places on the Golan Heights
Megalithic monuments
Megalithic monuments in the Middle East
Prehistoric sites on the Golan Heights
Burial monuments and structures
Stone circles in Asia
Geoglyphs